I figli del leopardo (also known as Sons of the Leopard) is a 1965 Italian comedy film directed by Sergio Corbucci starring the comic duo Franco and Ciccio that is a parody of The Leopard.

Plot
Sicily, 1860. The Baron Tulico is a penniless man and womanizer, who abandons his mistress Maria Rosa for a marriage of convenience. The two pharmacists Franco and Ciccio, called for help from Maria, try to put the baron's head in place, but do not have time, because the two are recruited into the army of Giuseppe Garibaldi. After many adventures Franco and Ciccio track the baron, and force him to recognize the two of them as his legitimate children.

Cast
Franco Franchi - Franco / Maria Rosa
Ciccio Ingrassia - Ciccio / Baron Fifi
Evi Marandi - Margherita
Raimondo Vianello - General Baldigari
Alberto Bonucci - Babalone 
Anthony Steffen - Tenente Garibaldino (as Antonio De Teffè)
Vittorio Congia - Sgt. Nando Tazza
Silvio Bagolini - Don Basilio
Nino Vingelli -Farm manager
Mimmo Poli	- Farm manager
Mario Castellani
Elisa Mainardi
Ugo Bonardi
Eva Gioia

References

External links
 

1965 films
1960s buddy comedy films
1960s Italian-language films
1960s parody films
Italian parody films
Films set in 1860
Films directed by Sergio Corbucci
Films scored by Piero Umiliani
Italian buddy comedy films
Films with screenplays by Bruno Corbucci
1965 comedy films
1960s Italian films